The Unforgotten Path is a studio album by Jordan Rudess. It was released on November 16, 2015.

Composition 
Most tracks are covers from various albums or musicals. Tracks 3, 9, 16, and 17 are original pieces.

Track listing

Personnel 
 Jordan Rudess – grand piano

External links

References 

2015 albums
Covers albums
Jordan Rudess albums